Philypnodon is a genus of fishes in the family Eleotridae endemic to Australia and the coastal waters around it.

Species
Two species in this genus are recognized, though molecular studies indicate another undescribed species similar to the dwarf flathead gudgeon from the Lang Lang River in Victoria.
 Philypnodon grandiceps (J. L. G. Krefft, 1864) (flathead gudgeon)
 Philypnodon macrostomus Hoese & Reader, 2006 (dwarf flathead gudgeon)

References

Eleotridae
Taxa named by Pieter Bleeker